The Nikoladze is a Georgian noble (aznauri) family, originating from the province of Imereti, known since 14th-16th century.  Nikoladze family was included in the list of nobles of Georgia in 1860 in the so-called "Barkhatnaia Kniga" published in Saint Petersburg. The first mention of the name dates back to 14th century in the monastery of Tbeti (The Tbethi Synodal Records) under the name of "Nikolasdze" (ნიკოლასძე). The Nikoladze family was also mentioned in the Catholicate list of Abkhazia (Western Georgia).

Notable members

Niko Nikoladze
Iakob Nikoladze
Koka Nikoladze

References

Noble families of Georgia (country)
Georgian-language surnames
Patronymic surnames
Surnames from given names